Ishkhan may refer to:

Ishkhan (title), an Armenian medieval feudal title, meaning "prince"
Ishkhan (fedayi), an Armenian freedom fighter born Nikoghayos Mikaelian
Sevan trout (Salmo ischchan), an endemic fish species of Lake Sevan, Armenia
Ishkhani, a monastery in Artvin Province, Turkey